Astragalus zionis is a species of legume known by the common name Zion milkvetch.  It is one of the earliest flowers to bloom in Zion canyon.
 
Its range extends from Zion National Park across southern Utah through Glen Canyon to San Juan County, Utah; at altitudes of 970 to 2200 meters.

Flowers are purple and the foliage is silvery.  Pods are rather hairy, somewhat inflated, usually mottled and become nearly one inch long.

References

zionis
Flora of Utah
Plants described in 1895
Flora without expected TNC conservation status